Central Park situated in Salt Lake is a public urban park. It is also known as Banabitan. It is the second largest open space in Kolkata Metropolitan Area after the Maidan. It is a favorite hangout for lovers.  This park is easily reachable from the Karunamoyee Bus Terminus in Salt Lake. Central Park metro station and depot of Kolkata Metro Line 2 are located here.  On the roads surrounding the park are the buildings where the West Bengal government has relocated many government departments.

The park is built around an expansive water body. There is a bridge which connects on side of the lake to an island which has a pagoda. The lake serves as a haven for water birds like lesser whistling duck, common moorhen, white-breasted waterhen, rufous treepie, cattle egret, cormorants and other species. There are also boating facilities in a cordoned off section of the lake near the rose garden.

The park has a very beautiful rose garden (near Gate No.1, opposite of Bikash Bhawan). The rose garden is bordered by rows of hedges surrounding the rose plants. When in bloom, the rose flowers present a delightful sight.

The park's butterfly garden has several species of butterflies. The butterfly garden consists of several plots where shrubs and trees on which butterflies and their larvae (caterpillar) feed, have been planted. Dedicated gardeners maintain these areas under the guidance of   Nature Mates - Nature Club. The West Bengal Forest Dept. supports this initiative. The butterfly garden can be easily reached after entering the park from Gate No.1 and then taking a right from the main walking track.

Gallery

References

Parks in Kolkata